Rances refers to the following places:

 Rances, Switzerland
 Rances, Aube